In combinatorial mathematics, Dobiński's formula states that the n-th Bell number Bn (i.e., the number of partitions of a set of size n) equals

where  denotes Euler's number.
The formula is named after G. Dobiński, who published it in 1877.

Probabilistic content

In the setting of probability theory, Dobiński's formula represents the nth moment of the Poisson distribution with mean 1. Sometimes Dobiński's formula is stated as saying that the number of partitions of a set of size n equals the nth moment of that distribution.

Reduced formula

The computation of the sum of Dobiński's series can be reduced to a finite sum of    terms, taking into account the information  that  is an integer. Precisely one has, for any integer  

Indeed, since , one has 

Therefore  for all   
so that the tail  is dominated by the series , which implies , whence the reduced formula.

Generalization

Proof

One proof relies on a formula for the generating function for Bell numbers, 

The power series for the exponential gives

so 

Another style of proof was given by Rota.  Recall that if x and n are nonnegative integers then the number of one-to-one functions that map a size-n set into a size-x set is the falling factorial

Let ƒ be any function from a size-n set A into a size-x set B.  For any b ∈ B, let ƒ −1(b) = {a ∈ A : ƒ(a) = b}.  Then } is a partition of A.  Rota calls this partition the "kernel" of the function ƒ.  Any function from A into B factors into
 one function that maps a member of A to the element of the kernel to which it belongs, and
 another function, which is necessarily one-to-one, that maps the kernel into B.
The first of these two factors is completely determined by the partition  that is the kernel.  The number of one-to-one functions from  into B is (x)||, where || is the number of parts in the partition .  Thus the total number of functions from a size-n set A into a size-x set B is

the index  running through the set of all partitions of A.  On the other hand, the number of functions from A into B is clearly xn.  Therefore, we have

Rota continues the proof using linear algebra, but it is enlightening to introduce a Poisson-distributed random variable X with mean 1.  The equation above implies that the nth moment of this random variable is

where E stands for expected value.  But we shall show that all the quantities E((X)k) equal 1.  It follows that

and this is just the number of partitions of the set A.  

The quantity E((X)k) is called the kth factorial moment of the random variable X.  To show that this equals 1 for all k when X is a Poisson-distributed random variable with mean 1, recall that this random variable assumes each value integer value  with probability .  Thus

Notes and references

Combinatorics
Poisson point processes
Articles containing proofs